Professor Heinz Wolff's Gravity is a puzzle video game released on Wii, DS and PC formats. It is published by Deep Silver and developed by EM Studios. The game is named after Heinz Wolff.

Gameplay 

The game features 100 puzzles which require the use of physics to solve. As its name suggests, gravity is the primary factor, along with friction. The goal of each level is to press a red button. The player is given a number of objects like beams, marbles, see-saws and blocks to achieve this. The nature of the game often means that there is more than one way to reach the objective.

To start a level, the player places all the mobile elements such that they remain at rest. He then presses the start button (a green arrow), at which point one (or more) large spheres or powered carts are released from a black portal. This provides energy for the other elements to trigger the red button. There is no requirement as to what object presses the red button, so long as it is pressed.

Sandboxes 
There are 20 sandbox levels which have no goal, one unlocked for every five game levels beaten. They allow the player to interact with the game elements and physics engine. In addition, they allow the player to remove the effect of gravity and to submerge the bottom quarter of the scene in water to affect buoyant objects.

Level editor 
There is also a full level editor where a player can create new levels on par with the 100 pre-built levels.

Mini games 
There are also four mini-games, called 'party-mode' in-game, which all utilize the same physics engine as the main game.

Tallest Tower is a challenge to build the tallest structure to survive an earthquake. The player has 35 seconds to place beams and blocks on the central platform. After the earthquake occurs, the tower is scored by the highest remaining point it reaches.

In Up and Down, the player uses a cannon to fire balls into buckets placed in the screen. There are different sized buckets with corresponding different point values. There are five buckets at the start, and each time a ball is scored into one of them, it is replaced by a different bucket at a different location. The goal is to earn the most points with the available 40 balls.

In Clear the Decks, the player uses a cannon to eliminate colored blocks in an area on the right of the screen. The player has a total supply of 35 balls colored red, green, and blue. The cannon fires colored balls which eliminate any block of the same color they contact. However, the ball disappears when it contacts a block of differing color. Periodically, additional blocks fall into the pen. The more blocks eliminated, the higher the score.

In Tower Topple, the player uses a cannon to knock over a tower built on a pedestal. The goal is to use the fewest balls to knock the entirety of the tower off-screen. There is no limit on the number of balls used.

Reception 
Critical response for Professor Heinz Wolff's Gravity has generally been lukewarm, receiving an overall score of 63 on Metacritic. The website IGN awarded it 59 out of 100, citing it had potential to be a sleeper hit, but was too light on content for the price tag.

References

External links 
Professor Heinz Wolff's Gravity

2008 video games
Nintendo DS games
Puzzle video games
Video games based on real people
Video games developed in the United Kingdom
Wii games
Windows games
Deep Silver games
Extra Mile Studios games